This is a list of Ministers of Justice of Brazil.

Empire of Brazil

Reign of Pedro I

Regency period

Reign of Pedro II

Republican period

First Brazilian Republic

Second Brazilian Republic

Estado Novo (Third Brazilian Republic)

Fourth Brazilian Republic

Military Dictatorship (Fifth Brazilian Republic)

Sixth Brazilian Republic

References

 
Justice